Edward Francis Lennon (August 17, 1897 – September 13, 1947) was a pitcher in Major League Baseball. He played for the Philadelphia Phillies in 1928.

References

External links

1897 births
1947 deaths
Major League Baseball pitchers
Philadelphia Phillies players
Niagara Purple Eagles baseball players
Baseball players from Philadelphia